XEPZ-AM (1190 kHz) is a radio station in Ciudad Juárez, Chihuahua, Mexico, also serving El Paso, Texas. It is owned by Grupo Radiorama. The station simulcasts the pop format of XHEPR-FM 99.1 Máxima.

History
XEPZ received its concession on January 4, 1964. It was owned by Rafael Fitzmaurice Beltrán del Río until 1973, when it was bought by Radiorama.

The station was originally known as "La Norteña", broadcasting a grouper format, then it left the La Norteña grupero format, flipping to Radio Centro 1190 in 2015, taking it away from XHEPR-FM. The station flipped to El Heraldo Radio on October 7, 2020., then returned to Radio Centro 1190 in 2021, the last year that Grupo Radio Centro operated the station.

On April 1, 2022, its operations, along with those of XHEPR-FM 99.1, passed to Francisco Antonio Muñoz Muñoz, owner of XHFAMA-FM of Camargo, and it began simulcasting XHEPR's new Máxima format.

External links

References

Radio stations in Chihuahua
Mass media in Ciudad Juárez
1964 establishments in Mexico
Radio stations established in 1964
Grupo Radio Centro